Joseph Jules Zerey (born 9 June 1941 in Alexandria, Egypt) is a retired archbishop of the Melkite Greek Catholic Church and former Apostolic Vicar of Jerusalem.

Career

Zerey was ordained a priest on 5 May 1967 and started Working at the Patriarchal College School in Cairo in 1967. In  1972 he was appointed as director of the Patriarchal College School in Heliopolis. He was a patron of the Church of St. Joseph in Al Zaytoon-Cairo from 1985 to 2001, and president of the second-degree spiritual Court.

On 22 June 2001 he was appointed titular Archbishop of Damietta and Auxiliary Bishop of Antioch. He was consecrated bishop on 9 November 2001 by Patriarch Gregory III Laham, assisted by co-consecrators Archbishops Elias Zoghby and Paul Antaki. On 22 June 2001 Zerey was appointed Patriarchal Vicar of Alexandria and Synkellos for the Melkite Church in Egypt and Sudan.
 
On 4 June 2008 Zerey was appointed Vicar Apostolic of Jerusalem. During 2010 Zerey was a participant in the Synod of Bishops for the Middle East in Rome. At the synod he published an intervention discussing the need to re-evangelize Christians living in the Holy Land and announcing the creation of a new international center for family spirituality in Nazareth.

On February 9, 2018, Zerey was replaced as Patriarchal Vicar of Jerusalem by the Melkite Synod, due to his age.  He was succeeded by Archbishop Yasser Ayyash.

Distinctions
 Grand Prior of the Patriarchal Order of the Holy Cross of Jerusalem

Gallery

Notes

External links

 Monseigneur Joseph-Jules Zerey: Curriculum Vitae
 Joseph Jules Zerey on Faith
 Gcatholic
 Apostolische Afrika
 Melkite Greek Catholic Church. Hierarchy

Melkite Greek Catholic bishops
1941 births
Living people
Members of the Patriarchal Order of the Holy Cross of Jerusalem
Egyptian Christian clergy
Egyptian Melkite Greek Catholics
People from Alexandria
Eastern Catholic bishops in Africa
Eastern Catholic bishops in Asia